This was the first edition of the tournament.

Aliona Bolsova won the title, defeating Tamara Korpatsch in the final, 6–4, 6–2.

Seeds

Draw

Finals

Top half

Bottom half

References

External Links
Main Draw

Open Villa de Madrid - Singles